The Académie de Stanislas is a learned society founded in Nancy, France on 28 December 1750 by the King of Poland, Duke of Lorraine and Bar, Stanisław Leszczyński, under the name Société Royale des Sciences et Belles-Lettres de Nancy.

It was established in the old Jesuit College, the building which founded the Nancy-Université until its temporary suppression by the Jacobin Convention in 1793, and which has now become the Municipal Library of Nancy.

Presidents 
 13 June 2010 : Christiane Dupuy-Stutzmann
 1900 : Charles de Meixmoron de Dombasle

Past members 
Charles Berlet, Jacqueline Brumaire, Henri Colin, Charles Coqueley de Chaussepierre, Auguste Digot, Gilles Fabre, Nicolas-Louis François de Neufchâteau, Émile Gallé, André Grandpierre, Maurice Grandpierre, Prosper Guerrier de Dumast, Alain Larcan, Cardinal François-Désiré Mathieu, Montesquieu, René Nicklès, Charles Palissot de Montenoy, Maurice Perrin, Christian Pfister, Joseph de Pommery, Dr. André Remy (22 January 1949), Julien Thoulet (1894), Élise Voïart (first woman member).

Honorary member 
André Rossinot, Mayor of Nancy

Associated corresponding members

Present corresponding members 
Jean-Jacques Aillagon, Christiane Desroches Noblecourt, Jean Favier, Marc Fumaroli, Yves Guéna, Otto von Habsburg-Lorraine, Jean Tulard

Past corresponding members 
Clovis Brunel, Gaspard-Gustave Coriolis, Amiral Émile Guépratte, Charles Hermite, Cardinal Paul-Émile Léger, Joseph Liouville, Pierre Messmer, Dr. André Remy (5/5/1945), Roger Viry-Babel, Józef Andrzej Załuski

References

External links 
 Académie de Stanislas
 Memoirs of the Académie de Stanislas from 1853 to 1931, listed by the Bibliothèque nationale de France on Gallica

Learned societies of France
1750 establishments in France
Nancy, France
Organizations based in Grand Est